Maytime is a 1937 American musical and romantic-drama film produced by MGM. It was directed by Robert Z. Leonard, and stars Jeanette MacDonald and Nelson Eddy. The screenplay was rewritten from the book for Sigmund Romberg's 1917 operetta Maytime by Rida Johnson Young, Romberg's librettist; however, only one musical number by Romberg was retained.

The film's story greatly resembles that of Noël Coward's operetta Bitter Sweet, including the "frame story" surrounding the main plot. Three years later, MGM filmed Bitter Sweet (1940), a Technicolor version, but altered the plot so that audiences would not notice the similarities.

Plot
At a small town May Day celebration, elderly Miss Morrison (Jeanette MacDonald) tries to console her young friend Kip (Tom Brown), whose sweetheart Barbara (Lynne Carver) has been offered a job on the operatic stage. Later, Barbara goes for comfort to Miss Morrison, who reveals that years ago she was the internationally famous opera diva Marcia Mornay. Miss Morrison then relates her story: Marcia, a young American singer in Paris, is guided to success by famed but stern voice teacher Nicolai Nazaroff (John Barrymore), who introduces her at the court of Louis Napoleon.

That night, Nicolai proposes to Marcia and she accepts, but they both know that she is not in love with him. Later, feeling restless, Marcia takes a ride, and she is stranded in the Latin Quarter when her driver's horse runs away. In a tavern, she meets American student Paul Allison (Nelson Eddy), who is also a singer, but not as ambitious as Marcia. Although they are attracted to each other, she refuses to see him again out of loyalty to Nicolai, but promises to lunch with him the next day. They enjoy their lunch together, but Marcia again says that they can no longer see each other and leaves. Paul then steals tickets to see her perform in the opera Les Huguenots that evening, and after he is thrown out of his seat by the manager, he goes to her dressing room and only leaves when she promises to join him at St. Cloud for a May Day celebration. During the celebration, Paul tells her he loves her, but she says that she owes Nicolai too much and never could break a promise to him. They part after vowing to remember their day together.

Seven years later, Marcia, who has married Nicolai, has become the toast of the operatic world, but upon her triumphant return to America, she realizes that her life is hollow. Although faithful and devoted to Nicolai, her lack of passion for him has made them both unhappy. In New York, Nicolai arranges for Marcia to sing 'Czaritza' (a fictional opera with music from Tchaikovsky's Symphony Number 5), co-starring Paul, who has become a baritone of some note. Nicolai does not realize that she is still in love with Paul. At rehearsal, they act at first as if they never have met, but Nicolai begins to suspect the truth when Archipenco (Herman Bing), Paul's singing teacher, talks about meeting Marcia in Paris many years earlier. Nicolai then recognizes Paul as the young man who left Marcia's dressing room after the performance of Les Huguenots.

On a brilliant opening night, Nicolai becomes jealous over the obvious emotion in Paul and Marcia's onstage love scenes, but doesn't know that they plan to run away together. Later, at their hotel, when Nicolai questions Marcia, she asks for her freedom, which he promises to give. Marcia soon discovers that Nicolai has gone after Paul with a gun. At Paul's apartment, Nicolai shoots him just as Marcia arrives. Paul then dies in her arms, telling her that memories of their May Day together did last him all his life. It is presumed that Nicolai will be arrested for Paul's killing.

At the conclusion of her story, Miss Morrison helps Barbara realize that she and Kip belong together. As she watches the young lovers embrace, Miss Morrison quietly dies. Her spirit finally is united with her sweetheart in death.

Cast

Awards and honors
The film was nominated for two Academy Awards.
 Academy Award for Best Music, Scoring (nominated)
 Academy Award for Best Sound, Recording (Douglas Shearer) (nominated)

The film is recognized by American Film Institute in these lists:
 2006: AFI's Greatest Movie Musicals – Nominated

Soundtrack
 "Now It's the Month of Maying"
 Music by Thomas Morley ("Now Is the Month of Maying"), plus English traditional "Sumer is icumen in", arranged by Sigmund Romberg
 Sung by chorus
 "Will You Remember (Sweetheart)?"
 Music by Sigmund Romberg
 Lyrics by Rida Johnson Young
 Sung by Nelson Eddy
 "Plantons da Vigne"
 Sung by Nelson Eddy
 "Vive l'Opera"
 Music by Herbert Stothart
 Lyrics by Bob Wright (as Robert Wright) and Chet Forrest (as George Forrest)
 Sung by Nelson Eddy and chorus
 "Ham and Eggs"
 Music by Herbert Stothart
 Lyrics by Bob Wright (as Robert Wright) and Chet Forrest (as George Forrest)
 Sung by Nelson Eddy and chorus
 "Carry Me Back to Old Virginny"
 Written by James Allen Bland
 Sung by Nelson Eddy and Jeanette MacDonald
 "Santa Lucia"
 Sung by Jeanette MacDonald, Nelson Eddy and an uncredited singer
 "Czaritza"
 (based on Symphony No. 5)
 Composed by Pyotr Ilyich Tchaikovsky
 Sung by Jeanette MacDonald, Nelson Eddy and chorus
 "Les filles de Cadix"
 Written by Léo Delibes
 Lyrics by Alfred de Musset
 Sung by Jeanette MacDonald
 "Le Régiment de Sambre et Meuse"
 Written by Robert Planquette
 Sung by Jeanette MacDonald and chorus
 "Nobles seigneur, salut"
 from the opera Les Huguenots
 Written by Giacomo Meyerbeer
 Libretto by Eugène Scribe
 Sung by Jeanette MacDonald and chorus
 "Cavatine du Page "Une dame, noble et sage"
 from the opera Les Huguenots Act 1
 Written by Giacomo Meyerbeer
 Librette by Eugène Scribe
 Sung by Jeanette MacDonald and chorus
 Lucia di Lammermoor
 Written by Gaetano Donizetti
 William Tell
 Written by Gioachino Rossini
 Tannhäuser
 Written by Richard Wagner
 Tristan und Isolde
 Written by Richard Wagner
 Faust
 Written by Charles Gounod

References

Green, Stanley (1999) Hollywood Musicals Year by Year (2nd ed.), pub. Hal Leonard Corporation  pages 66–67

External links

1937 films
1930s romantic musical films
1937 romantic drama films
American black-and-white films
American musical drama films
American romantic drama films
Cultural depictions of Napoleon III
1930s English-language films
Films based on operettas
Films directed by Robert Z. Leonard
Films scored by Herbert Stothart
Films set in Paris
Films set in the 1860s
Films set in the 1900s
Metro-Goldwyn-Mayer films
American romantic musical films
Films with screenplays by Noel Langley
Films scored by Edward Ward (composer)
1930s American films